A legislative council is the legislature, or one of the legislative chambers, of a nation, colony, or subnational division such as a province or state. It was commonly used to label unicameral or upper house legislative bodies in the British (former) colonies. However, it has also been used as designation in other (non-Commonwealth) nations. A member of a legislative council is commonly referred to as an MLC.

In the United States, a legislative council has a different connotation, and means a council within a legislature which supervises nonpartisan support staff.

History
In the British Empire, the authority under which legislative councils have been constituted has varied: some under the prerogative, others by acts of parliament, and some by commission and royal instructions. Particularly, unicameral or the upper house in a bicameral legislature (where traditionally many members were appointed by Governors, rather than elected) were given the designation "legislative council".

List of legislative councils

In India, the Vidhan Parishad is another name for the Legislative Council in those states with bicameral legislatures.

United States
In American English, the term "legislative council" has acquired a slightly different meaning since the 1930s. It refers to a joint committee with members from both houses of the state legislature, which supervises a staff of attorneys, accountants, and researchers charged with providing strictly nonpartisan support services to the legislature or to particular committees. The concept of the legislative council was first developed in Kansas and was implemented by the Kansas Legislature in 1933. Eventually, a majority of U.S. states adopted legislative councils, but under a variety of names. Kansas still uses a legislative council, although it was converted into the Kansas Legislative Coordinating Council in 1971. Legislative councils operating under that name exist in the states of Arkansas, Arizona, Colorado, Montana, North Dakota, Texas, and Wisconsin. Several states use the term "commission" for the same thing, including New Jersey and Nevada.

A few states, like California, have a "legislative counsel", not "council", who is appointed by a vote of the entire legislature and is thus responsible to the body as a whole rather than a "council" within it.

See also

House of Assembly
Legislative assembly
Legislative Yuan
 Legislative Council of Macao

References

Governance of the British Empire
Legislatures